Parfentyevo is a rural locality (a village) in Kolokshanskoye Rural Settlement, Sobinsky District, Vladimir Oblast, Russia. The population was 98 as of 2010.

Geography 
Parfentyevo is located 16 km northeast of Sobinka (the district's administrative centre) by road. Koloksha is the nearest rural locality.

References 

Rural localities in Sobinsky District